The Strait of Hormuz (  Tangeh-ye Hormoz ,  Maḍīq Hurmuz, or  Madīq Bab Al Salam ["the door of peace"]) is a strait between the Persian Gulf and the Gulf of Oman. It provides the only sea passage from the Persian Gulf to the open ocean and is one of the world's most strategically important choke points. On the north coast lies Iran, and on the south coast lies the Musandam peninsula, shared by the United Arab Emirates and Musandam Governorate, an exclave of Oman.

A third of the world's liquefied natural gas and almost 25% of total global oil consumption passes through the strait, making it a highly important strategic location for international trade.

Etymology
The opening to the Persian Gulf was described, but not given a name, in the Periplus of the Erythraean Sea, a 1st-century mariner's guide:

In the 10th17th centuries AD, the Kingdom of Ormus, which seems to have given the strait its name, was located here. Scholars, historians and linguists derive the name "Ormuz" from the local Persian word  Hur-mogh meaning date palm. In the local dialects of Hurmoz and Minab this strait is still called Hurmogh and has the aforementioned meaning.
The resemblance of this word with the name of the Zoroastrian god  Hormoz (a variant of Ahura Mazda) has resulted in the popular belief that these words are related.

Jodocus Hondius labels the Strait Basora fretum ("Strait of Basra") on his 1606 map of the Ottoman Empire.

Navigation
To reduce the risk of collision, ships moving through the Strait follow a Traffic Separation Scheme (TSS): inbound ships use one lane, outbound ships another, each lane being two miles wide. The lanes are separated by a two-mile-wide "median".

To traverse the Strait, ships pass through the territorial waters of Iran and Oman under the transit passage provisions of the United Nations Convention on the Law of the Sea.
Although not all countries have ratified the convention, most countries, including the U.S., accept these customary navigation rules as codified in the Convention.

Thus, by mid-1972, the Strait of Hormuz was completely "closed" by the combined territorial waters of Iran and Oman. During the 1970s, neither Iran or Oman attempted to impede the passage of warships through the strait, but in the 1980s, both countries asserted claims that were different from customary (old) law. Upon ratifying UNCLOS in August 1989, Oman submitted declarations confirming its 1981 royal decree that only innocent passage is permitted through its territorial sea. The declarations further asserted that prior permission was required before foreign warships could pass through Omani territorial waters. Upon signing the convention in December 1982, Iran entered a declaration stating "that only states parties to the Law of the Sea Convention shall be entitled to benefit from the contractual rights created therein", including "the right of transit passage through straits used for international navigation". In May 1993, Iran enacted a comprehensive law on maritime areas, several provisions of which conflict with UNCLOS provisions, including a requirement that warships, submarines, and nuclear-powered ships obtain permission before exercising innocent passage through Iran's territorial waters. The United States does not recognize any of the claims by Oman and Iran and has contested each of them.

Oman has a radar site Link Quality Indicator (LQI) to monitor the TSS in the Strait of Hormuz. This site is on a small island on the peak of Musandam Governorate.

Oil trade flow

A 2007 report from the Center for Strategic and International Studies also stated that 17 million barrels passed out of the Persian Gulf daily, but that oil flows through the Strait accounted for roughly 40% of all world-traded oil.

According to the U.S. Energy Information Administration, in 2011, an average of 14 tankers per day passed out of the Persian Gulf through the Strait carrying  of crude oil. This was said to represent 35% of the world's seaborne oil shipments and 20% of oil traded worldwide.  The report stated that more than 85% of these crude oil exports went to Asian markets, with Japan, India, South Korea and China the largest destinations. In 2018 alone, 21 million barrels a day were passing through the strait - this means $1.17 billion worth of oil a day, at September 2019 prices.

Events

Tanker War
The Tanker War phase of the Iran–Iraq War started when Iraq attacked the oil terminal and oil tankers at Iran's Kharg Island in early 1984. Saddam Hussein's aim in attacking Iranian shipping was, among other things, to provoke the Iranians to retaliate with extreme measures, such as closing the Strait of Hormuz to all maritime traffic, thereby bringing American intervention. Iran limited the retaliatory attacks to Iraqi shipping, leaving the strait open.

Operation Praying Mantis 

On 18 April 1988, the U.S. Navy waged a one-day battle against Iranian forces in and around the strait. The battle, dubbed Operation Praying Mantis by the United States, was launched in retaliation for the USS Samuel B. Roberts striking a mine laid in the channel by Iran on 14 April 1988. U.S. forces sank one frigate, one gunboat, and up to six armed speedboats, as well as seriously damaging a second frigate.

Downing of Iran Air 655

On 3 July 1988, 290 people were killed when an Iran Air Airbus A300 was shot down over the strait by the United States Navy guided missile cruiser USS Vincennes (CG-49) when it was wrongly identified as a jet fighter.

Collision between USS Newport News and tanker Mogamigawa
On 8 January 2007, the nuclear submarine USS Newport News, traveling submerged, struck , a 300,000-ton Japanese-flagged very large crude tanker, south of the strait. There were no injuries, and no oil leaked from the tanker.

Tensions in 2008

2008 U.S.–Iranian naval dispute

A series of naval stand-offs between Iranian speedboats and U.S. warships in the Strait of Hormuz occurred in December 2007 and January 2008. U.S. officials accused Iran of harassing and provoking their naval vessels, but Iranian officials denied the allegations. On 14 January 2008, U.S. Navy officials appeared to contradict the Pentagon version of the 16 January event, in which the Pentagon had reported that U.S. vessels had almost fired on approaching Iranian boats. The Navy's regional commander, Vice Admiral Kevin Cosgriff, said the Iranians had "neither anti-ship missiles nor torpedoes" and he "wouldn't characterize the posture of the US 5th Fleet as afraid of these small boats".

Iranian defence policy
On 29 June 2008, the commander of Iran's Revolutionary Guard, Mohammad Ali Jafari, said that if either Israel or the United States attacked Iran, it would seal off the Strait of Hormuz to wreak havoc in the oil markets. This followed more ambiguous threats from Iran's oil minister and other government officials that an attack on Iran would result in turmoil in the world's oil supply.

Vice Admiral Kevin Cosgriff, commander of the U.S. 5th Fleet stationed in Bahrain across the Persian Gulf from Iran, warned that such Iranian action would be considered an act of war, and the U.S. would not allow Iran to hold hostage nearly a third of the world's oil supply.

On 8 July 2008, Ali Shirazi, a mid-level clerical aide to Iran's Supreme Leader Ayatollah Ali Khamenei, was quoted by the student news agency ISNA as telling the Revolutionary Guards, "The Zionist regime is pressuring White House officials to attack Iran. If they commit such a stupidity, Tel Aviv and U.S. shipping in the Persian Gulf will be Iran's first targets and they will be burned."

Naval activity in 2008
In the last week of July 2008, in the Operation Brimstone, dozens of U.S. and foreign naval ships came to undergo joint exercises for possible military activity in the shallow waters off the coast of Iran.

As of 11 August 2008, more than 40 U.S. and allied ships reportedly were en route to the Strait of Hormuz. One U.S. carrier battle group from Japan would complement the two which are already in the Persian Gulf, for a total of five battle groups, not including the submarines.

Collision between USS Hartford and USS New Orleans

The collision, which slightly injured 15 sailors aboard Hartford, ruptured a fuel tank aboard New Orleans, spilling  of marine diesel fuel.

U.S.–Iran tensions in 2011–2012

On 27 December 2011, Iranian Vice President Mohammad-Reza Rahimi threatened to cut off oil supply from the Strait of Hormuz should economic sanctions limit, or cut off, Iranian oil exports. A U.S. Fifth Fleet spokeswoman said in response that the Fleet was "always ready to counter malevolent actions", whilst Admiral Habibollah Sayyari of the Islamic Republic of Iran Navy claimed that cutting off oil shipments would be "easy". Despite an initial 2% rise in oil prices, oil markets ultimately did not react significantly to the Iranian threat, with oil analyst Thorbjoern Bak Jensen of Global Risk Management concluding that "they cannot stop the flow for a longer period due to the amount of U.S. hardware in the area".

On 3 January 2012, Iran threatened to take action if the U.S. Navy moves an aircraft carrier back into the Persian Gulf.  Iranian Army chief Ataollah Salehi said the United States had moved an aircraft carrier out of the Persian Gulf because of Iran's naval exercises, and Iran would take action if the ship returned.  "Iran will not repeat its warning...the enemy's carrier has been moved to the Gulf of Oman because of our drill.  I recommend and emphasize to the American carrier not to return to the Persian Gulf", he said.

The U.S. Navy spokesman Commander Bill Speaks quickly responded that deployment of U.S. military assets would continue as has been the custom stating: "The U.S. Navy operates under international maritime conventions to maintain a constant state of high vigilance in order to ensure the continued, safe flow of maritime traffic in waterways critical to global commerce."

While earlier statements from Iran had little effect on global oil markets, coupled with the new sanctions, these comments from Iran are driving crude futures higher, up over 4%.  Pressure on prices reflect a combination of uncertainty driven further by China's recent response – reducing oil January 2012 purchases from Iran by 50% compared to those made in 2011.

The U.S. led sanctions may be "beginning to bite" as Iranian currency has recently lost some 12% of its value.  Further pressure on Iranian currency was added by French Foreign Minister Alain Juppé who was quoted as calling for more "strict sanctions" and urged EU countries to follow the US in freezing Iranian central bank assets and imposing an embargo on oil exports.

On 7 January 2012, the British government announced that it would be sending the Type 45 destroyer  to the Persian Gulf. Daring, which is the lead ship of her class is one of the "most advanced warships" in the world, and will undertake its first mission in the Persian Gulf. The British Government however have said that this move has been long-planned, as Daring will replace another Armilla patrol frigate.

On 9 January 2012, Iranian Defense Minister Ahmad Vahidi denied that Iran had ever claimed that it would close the Strait of Hormuz, saying that "the Islamic Republic of Iran is the most important provider of security in the strait... if one threatens the security of the Persian Gulf, then all are threatened."

The Iranian Foreign Ministry confirmed on 16 January 2012 that it has received a letter from the United States concerning the Strait of Hormuz, "via three different channels." Authorities were considering whether to reply, although the contents of the letter were not divulged. The United States had previously announced its intention to warn Iran that closing the Strait of Hormuz is a "red line" that would provoke an American response. Gen. Martin E. Dempsey, the chairman of the Joint Chiefs of Staff, said this past weekend that the United States would "take action and re-open the strait", which could be accomplished only by military means, including minesweepers, warship escorts and potentially airstrikes. Defense Secretary Leon E. Panetta told troops in Texas that the United States would not tolerate Iran's closing of the strait. Nevertheless, Iran continued to discuss the impact of shutting the Strait on world oil markets, saying that any disruption of supply would cause a shock to markets that "no country" could manage.

By 23 January, a flotilla had been established by countries opposing Iran's threats to close the Hormuz Strait. These ships operated in the Persian Gulf and Arabian Sea off the coast of Iran.

On 24 January, tensions rose further after the European Union imposed sanctions on Iranian oil. A senior member of Iran's parliament said that the Islamic Republic would close the entry point to the Persian Gulf if new sanctions block its oil exports.  "If any disruption happens regarding the sale of Iranian oil, the Strait of Hormuz will definitely be closed," Mohammad Kossari, deputy head of parliament's foreign affairs and national security committee, told the semi-official Fars News Agency.

2015 seizure of MV Maersk Tigris

On 28 April 2015, IRGCN patrol boats contacted the Marshall Islands-flagged container ship Maersk Tigris, which was westbound through the strait, and directed the ship to proceed further into Iranian territorial waters, according to a spokesman for the U.S. Defense Department. When the ship's master declined, one of the Iranian craft fired shots across the bridge of Maersk Tigris. The captain complied and proceeded into Iranian waters near Larak Island. The US Navy sent aircraft and a destroyer, USS Farragut, to monitor the situation.

Maersk says they have agreed to pay an Iranian company $163,000 over a dispute about 10 container boxes transported to Dubai in 2005. The court ruling allegedly ordered a fine of $3.6 million.

2018 threats of strait closure
In July 2018, Iran again made threats to close the strait. Citing looming American sanctions after the U.S withdrew from the JCPOA deal earlier in the year. Iran's Revolutionary Guards reported they were ready to carry out the action if required.

In August 2018, Iran test-fired a ballistic missile for the first time in 2018. According to the officials, the anti-ship Fateh-110 Mod 3 flew over 100 miles on a flight path over the Strait of Hormuz to a test range in the Iranian desert. "It was shore-to-shore", said one U.S. official describing the launch, who like the others requested anonymity to discuss sensitive information.

2019 threats of strait closure
On 22 April 2019, the U.S. ended the oil waivers, which allowed some of Iran’s customers to import Iranian oil, without risking financial penalties as part of the U.S. economic sanctions against Iran. Again, this had implication playing out in the Strait of Hormuz, as Iranian threats of Strait closure was put forward in April 2019.

Aljazeera quoted Major-General Mohammad Baqeri of the Iranian Armed Forces, stating "We are not after closing the Strait of Hormuz but if the hostility of the enemies increases, we will be able to do so". Baqeri is also quoted for stating "If our oil does not pass, the oil of others shall not pass the Strait of Hormuz either".

2019 U.S.–Iran tensions and attacks on oil tankers 

On the morning of 13 June 2019, the oil tankers Front Altair and Kokuka Courageous were both rocked by explosions shortly before dawn, the crew of the latter reported seeing a flying object strike the ship; the crew were rescued by the destroyer  while the crew of the Front Altair were rescued by Iranian ships. That afternoon, U.S. secretary of state Mike Pompeo issued a statement accusing Iran of the attacks. Iran subsequently denied the accusations, calling the incident a false-flag attack.

In July 2019, a Stena Bulk Tanker, Stena Impero, sailing under a British flag, was boarded and captured by Iranian forces. The spokesman for Iran's Guardian Council, Abbas Ali Kadkhodaei, was quoted as describing the seizure as a "reciprocal action." This was presumed to be in reference to the seizure of an Iranian Tanker, Grace 1, bound for Syria in Gibraltar a few days prior.

In 2020, France deployed about 600 troops at sea and in the air under the CTF474 to protect maritime trade, regional business, and to ease local tensions. Since the first week of April 2020, the operation combines the Dutch frigate Ruyter, the French frigate Forbin, and one french airplane ATLANTIC2 (ATL2).

2020 Iranian military activity

In May 2020, Iran launched missiles at one of their own ships in a friendly fire accident, killing 19 sailors.

2021 Iranian ship seizure

On 4 January 2021, the Tasnim News Agency reported that a South Korea-flagged oil vessel headed from Saudi Arabia to the United Arab Emirates was seized for allegedly causing pollution violations. The ship was said to be carrying roughly 7,000 tons of ethanol. South Korea refused to comment on the accusation of causing oil pollution in the Strait of Hormuz. The ship, Hankuk Chemi, was headed to the UAE port Fujairah after loading oil from Jubail, Saudi Arabia on 2 January 2021, as per ship-tracking data gathered by Bloomberg.

2021 IRIS Kharg sinking

On 2 June 2021, the IRIS Kharg, a modified Ol-class replenishment oiler of the Islamic Republic of Iran Navy, sank in the Strait of Hormuz after catching fire. It was the IRIN's largest vessel.

Ability of Iran to hinder shipping

Millennium Challenge 2002 was a major war game exercise conducted by the United States armed forces in 2002.  According to a 2012 article in The Christian Science Monitor, it simulated an attempt by Iran to close the strait.  The assumptions and results were controversial. In the article, Iran's strategy beats the materially superior US armed forces.

A 2008 article in International Security contended that Iran could seal off or impede traffic in the Strait for a month, and an attempt by the U.S. to reopen it would be likely to escalate the conflict. In a later issue, however, the journal published a response which questioned some key assumptions and suggested a much shorter timeline for re-opening.

In December 2011, the Islamic Republic of Iran Navy began a ten-day exercise in international waters along the strait. The Iranian Rear Admiral Habibollah Sayyari stated that the strait would not be closed during the exercise; Iranian forces could easily accomplish that but such a decision must be made at a political level.

Captain John Kirby, a Pentagon spokesman, was quoted in a December 2011 Reuters article: "Efforts to increase tension in that part of the world are unhelpful and counter-productive. For our part, we are comfortable that we have in the region sufficient capabilities to honor our commitments to our friends and partners, as well as the international community."  In the same article, Suzanne Maloney, an Iran expert at the Brookings Institution, said, "The expectation is that the U.S. military could address any Iranian threat relatively quickly."

General Martin Dempsey, Chairman of the Joint Chiefs of Staff, said in January 2012 that Iran "has invested in capabilities that could, in fact, for a period of time block the Strait of Hormuz."  He also stated, "We've invested in capabilities to ensure that if that happens, we can defeat that."

A May 2012 article by Nilufer Oral, a Turkish researcher of maritime law, concludes that both the UNCLOS and the 1958 Convention on the High Seas would be violated if Iran followed through on its threat to block passage of vessels such as oil tankers, and that the act of passage is not related in law to the imposition of economic sanctions.  The article further asserts that a coastal state may prevent "transit or non-suspendable innocent passage" only if: 1) there is threatened or actual use of force, occurring during passage, against the sovereignty, territorial integrity, or political independence of a state bordering the strait; or 2) the vessel in any other way violates the principles of international law as embodied in the Charter of the United Nations.

Alternative shipping routes

In June 2012, Saudi Arabia reopened the Iraq Pipeline through Saudi Arabia (IPSA), which was confiscated from Iraq in 2001 and travels from Iraq across Saudi Arabia to a Red Sea port. It will have a capacity of 1.65 million barrels per day.

In July 2012, the UAE began using the new Habshan–Fujairah oil pipeline from the Habshan fields in Abu Dhabi to the Fujairah oil terminal on the Gulf of Oman, effectively bypassing the Strait of Hormuz. It has a maximum capacity of around 2 million barrels per day, over three-quarters of the UAE's 2012 production rate.  The UAE is also increasing Fujairah's storage and off-loading capacities. The UAE is building the world's largest crude oil storage facility in Fujairah with a capacity of holding 14 million barrels to enhance Fujairah's growth as a global oil and trading hub. The Habshan – Fujairah route secures the UAE's energy security and has the advantage of being a ground oil pipeline transportation which is considered the cheapest form of oil transportation and also reduces insurance costs as oil tankers would no longer enter the Persian Gulf.

In a July 2012 Foreign Policy article, Gal Luft compared Iran and the Strait of Hormuz to the Ottoman Empire and the Dardanelles, a choke point for shipments of Russian grain a century ago.  He indicated that tensions involving the Strait of Hormuz are leading those currently dependent on shipments from the Persian Gulf to find alternative shipping capabilities.  He stated that Saudi Arabia was considering building new pipelines to Oman and Yemen, and that Iraq might revive the disused Iraq–Syria pipeline to ship crude to the Mediterranean.  Luft stated that reducing Hormuz traffic "presents the West with a new opportunity to augment its current Iran containment strategy."

See also
Abu Musa island
Bandar Lengeh
Hormozgān Province
Kingdom of Hormuz
Musandam Peninsula
Hormuz Peace Initiative

References

Sources
 Mohammed Kookherdi (1997) Kookherd, an Islamic civil at Mehran river, third edition: Dubai
 [Atlas Gitashenasi Ostanhai Iran] (Gitashenasi Province Atlas of Iran)

Further reading

 
Bodies of water of Iran
Bodies of water of Oman
Bodies of water of the United Arab Emirates
Borders of Iran
Borders of Oman
Borders of the United Arab Emirates
Gulf of Oman
Landforms of Hormozgan Province
Hormuz
Bodies of water of the Persian Gulf
Hormuz
Hormuz
Hormuz